The Old Union School off Ohio State Route 314 in Chesterville, Ohio, was built in 1860. It was listed on the National Register of Historic Places in 1979.

The structure primarily incorporates Greek Revival architecture, but includes some Italianate features. It is the oldest remaining academic building in the area. The building was used for this purpose until 1890 and has since served as a residence.

References

National Register of Historic Places in Morrow County, Ohio
Greek Revival houses in Ohio
School buildings completed in 1860
Buildings and structures in Morrow County, Ohio